Ruth Jên (born 1964) is a Welsh artist, working in the old shoe shop in the village of Tal-y-bont, Ceredigion.

Biography
Born Ruth Jên Evans at Cefn Llwyd, she studied on an Art Foundation Course 
at Carmarthen before completing a degree in fine art in Cardiff (1983–1987), specialising in printmaking. She returned to Aberystwyth having completed her studies, and worked for Yr Academi Gymreig, and doing book cover illustration work on a freelance basis for the local publishers, Y Lolfa.Wales She painted the first mural in Tal-y-bont in 1991.

Ruth Jên's illustration work is often in mixed media, combining painting, collage and printmaking techniques.

Awards and honours 
 Bilingual Design Awards, Welsh Language Board 2002

References

External links 

1964 births
Living people
20th-century Welsh painters
21st-century Welsh painters
20th-century Welsh women artists
21st-century Welsh women artists
20th-century British printmakers
21st-century British printmakers
Alumni of Cardiff School of Art and Design
People from Ceredigion
Welsh printmakers
Welsh women painters
Women printmakers